Bobby Edward Duncum (born August 14, 1944) is an American retired professional wrestler. He is best known for his appearances for the World Wide Wrestling Federation, National Wrestling Alliance and American Wrestling Association from the late-1960s to the late-1980s. He is the father of the late professional wrestler Bobby Duncum Jr.

American football career 
Duncum was a three-year letterman with the West Texas A&M Buffaloes football team from 1964 to 1966. He was selected by the St. Louis Cardinals in the thirteenth round (331st overall) of the 1967 NFL/AFL Draft. He appeared in only four games with the Cardinals in 1968.

Professional wrestling career 
His wrestling persona was that of a heel cowboy and he wrestled some of the top babyface stars of the era such as Bob Backlund and Bruno Sammartino. In the AWA, along with Nick Bockwinkel, Ray Stevens and Blackjack Lanza, he was a member of famous wrestling stable, managed by Bobby Heenan, known as The Heenan Family. His famous catch phrase during interviews (and written phonetically) was "You unnastan?" ("you understand?"). His final match was on November 16, 1986, in Clarksburg, West Virginia, where he tag teamed with Lord Zoltan to defeat Troy Orndorff and Kurt Kaufman.

Championships and accomplishments 
American Wrestling Association
AWA World Tag Team Championship (1 time) - with Blackjack Lanza
Championship Wrestling from Florida
NWA Brass Knuckles Championship (Florida version) (2 times)
NWA Florida Global Tag Team Championship (1 time) - with Angelo Mosca
NWA Florida Tag Team Championship (3 times) - with Dick Murdoch (1 time), Don Jardine (1 time), and Killer Karl Kox (1 time)
NWA Florida Television Championship (1 time)
NWA Southern Heavyweight Championship (Florida version) (1 time)
NWA United States Tag Team Championship (Florida version) (1 time) - with Killer Karl Kox
Mid-Atlantic Championship Wrestling
NWA Brass Knuckles Championship (Mid-Atlantic version) (1 time)
Mid-South Sports / Georgia Championship Wrestling
NWA Columbus Heavyweight Championship (1 time)
NWA Georgia Tag Team Championship (1 time) - with Stan Vachon
NWA Macon Heavyweight Championship (1 time)
NWA Southeastern Heavyweight Championship (Georgia version) (1 time)
NWA Big Time Wrestling
NWA Texas Tag Team Championship (1 time) - with Chris Colt
Western States Sports
NWA Brass Knuckles Championship (Amarillo version) (1 time)
NWA Western States Tag Team Championship (2 times) - with Woody Farmer (1 time) and Dick Murdoch (1 time)

References

External links 
 
 
 

1944 births
American male professional wrestlers
Living people
People from Austin, Texas
Professional wrestlers from Texas
St. Louis Cardinals (football) players
The Heenan Family members
West Texas A&M Buffaloes football players
West Texas A&M University alumni
20th-century professional wrestlers
AWA World Tag Team Champions
NWA Florida Global Tag Team Champions
NWA Florida Tag Team Champions
NWA Florida Television Champions
NWA Southern Heavyweight Champions (Florida version)
NWA Brass Knuckles Champions (Florida version)
NWA Macon Heavyweight Champions